Wenshan Puzhehei Airport  is an airport serving Wenshan City in Yunnan Province, China. It is located 6 km from the center of Yanshan County and 25 km from Wenshan City.

Airlines and destinations

See also
List of airports in the People's Republic of China

References

External links
Yunnan Airport Group

Airports in Yunnan
Transport in Wenshan Zhuang and Miao Autonomous Prefecture